Union Dale is a borough in Susquehanna County, Pennsylvania, United States. The borough was incorporated in 1885.  Union Dale's population was 267 at the 2010 census.

Geography
Union Dale is located at  (41.715974, -75.486995).

Just outside Union Dale is the North Knob of Elk Mountain. It is the highest point in Eastern Pennsylvania, as well as in the Allegheny Plateau.

Demographics

As of the census of 2010, there were 267 people, 130 households, and 73 families residing in the borough. The population density was 111.2 people per square mile (43.4/km2). There were 157 housing units at an average density of 65.4 per square mile (25.5/km2). The racial makeup of the borough was 98.5% White, 1.1% African American, and 0.4% from two or more races. Hispanic or Latino of any race were 1.5% of the population.

There were 130 households, out of which 15.4% had children under the age of 18 living with them, 45.4% were married couples living together, 7.7% had a female householder with no husband present, and 43.8% were non-families. 40.8% of all households were made up of individuals, and 15.3% had someone living alone who was 65 years of age or older. The average household size was 2.05 and the average family size was 2.70.

In the borough the population was spread out, with 16.5% under the age of 18, 64% from 18 to 64, and 19.5% who were 65 years of age or older. The median age was 48 years.

The median income for a household in the borough was $39,375, and the median income for a family was $44,375. Males had a median income of $40,556 versus $32,857 for females. The per capita income for the borough was $20,908. About 6.5% of families and 12.5% of the population were below the poverty line, including 28.3% of those under age 18 and 22.9% of those age 65 or over.

Education
Forest City Regional School District is a Preschool-12th grade public school district serving residents of Union Dale.

See also
 Elk Mountain Ski Area
 North Knob

References

Boroughs in Susquehanna County, Pennsylvania
Pocono Mountains
Populated places established in 1885
1885 establishments in Pennsylvania